A Son of the Celestial is a short story by Willa Cather. It was first published on 15 January 1893 in The Hesperian.

Plot summary
In San Francisco, Yung and Ponter share their penchant for both Sanskrit and opium. When Yung fails to understand Hamlet by William Shakespeare, Ponter blames the Chinese man for being heathen. As requested, after Yung's death, Ponter sends him back to China.

Characters
Yung Le Ho, a white-haired Chinese man who lives in San Francisco. Although he was born in Nanking, he moved to India and finally to the United States. He understands Sanskrit and makes opium. He runs a bazaar for a living.
Ponter, a Professor of Sanskrit. He now works in a boarding-house and as an amanuensis for a lawyer. He likes to smoke opium.

Allusions to other works
Painting is mentioned through Michelangelo
Religious texts are mentioned through The Bible, Buddha, Confucius, and Vishnu.
Plato is also mentioned.
There is a quotation taken from Horace's Odes.

Allusions to actual history
The Chinese Treaty of 1880 is mentioned.

References

External links
Full Text at the Willa Cather Archive

1893 short stories
Short stories by Willa Cather
Works originally published in the Daily Nebraskan